Kelly Williford (born October 21, 1994) is an American born-Dominican female tennis player.

On 16 December 2019, she achieved her career-high singles ranking of world No. 1070. On 6 August 2018, she peaked at No. 619 in the doubles rankings.

Williford has represented the Dominican Republic in the Fed Cup, where she has a win–loss record of 5–7.

She is a native of the Basking Ridge section of Bernards Township, New Jersey, where she attended Ridge High School before moving on to play for the Virginia Tech Hokies women's tennis team.

ITF Circuit finals

Doubles: 8 (1 title, 7 runner–ups)

References

External links
 
 
 

1994 births
Living people
Dominican Republic female tennis players
Ridge High School alumni
People from Bernards Township, New Jersey
Sportspeople from Somerset County, New Jersey
Tennis people from New Jersey
Tennis players at the 2019 Pan American Games
Central American and Caribbean Games medalists in tennis
Central American and Caribbean Games silver medalists for the Dominican Republic
Pan American Games competitors for the Dominican Republic